Zirdan Zirun (also Romanized as Zīrdan  Zīrūn) is a village in Jazmurian Rural District, Jazmurian District, Rudbar-e Jonubi County, Kerman Province, Iran. At the 2006 census, its population was 154, in 27 families.

References 

Populated places in Rudbar-e Jonubi County